Joseph Michael Lynch (born May 29, 1985 in Plainview, New York) is an American former competitive pair skater. With partner Chloé Katz, he is the 2008 Couple de Nice silver medalist and the 2005 U.S. junior bronze medalist. In August 2011, they announced the end of their partnership.

Competitive highlights

 N = Novice level; J = Junior level

References

 2004-2005 Junior Grand Prix USA Results

External links
 Official Web Site
 

1985 births
American male pair skaters
Living people
People from Plainview, New York
20th-century American people
21st-century American people